This list of Skidmore, Owings, & Merrill buildings catalogs the work of the architectural firm Skidmore, Owings & Merill. The firm has completed some 10,000 projects.

List of works

References

Skidmore, Owings, and Merrill